The 2010 Australian Short Course Swimming Championships were held at the Brisbane Aquatic Centre from Wednesday 14 July to Sunday 18 July. They were organised by Swimming Australia and sponsored by Telstra.

The events were spread over five days of competition featuring heats in the morning, with semifinals and finals in the evening session. The format of the meet consisted of heats for all individual events with semifinals in the 50 and 100 m individual events. The 200 and 400 m events consisted of A and B finals with no semifinals whilst the 800 and 1500 m freestyle and relay events consisted of timed finals only.

Medal winners

Men's events

Legend:

Women's events

Legend:

See also
2010 in swimming
2010 Australian Swimming Championships

References

External links
2010 Telstra Australian Short Course Championships

Australian Short Course Swimming Championships
Australian Short Course Swimming Championships, 2010
Sports competitions in Brisbane
Swim
Swim